The Provisional Council of National Unity (PCNU;) was a provisional governmental body during the early 1990s in Romania. At that time, it was headed by Ion Iliescu of the National Salvation Front (FSN) along with a wide range of vice-presidents which also stemmed from various other political parties which acceded to the Romanian Parliament at that time, most notably Radu Câmpeanu, the first post-1989 president of the National Liberal Party (PNL), who was also vice-president of the Senate at the time.

The PCNU was founded shortly after the National Salvation Front became a political party and it was dissolved in 1991, one year prior to then forthcoming 1992 general election.

References

1990 establishments in Romania
Political organizations based in Romania
Politics of Romania
Provisional governments